Donald Milner Cameron AM (born 6 February 1940) is a former Australian politician. He was born in Brisbane, and educated at the Anglican Church Grammar School and the University of Queensland.

He became a junior corporate executive and then industrial officer for the Australian Association of Employers of Waterside Labour. He joined the Liberal Party of Australia, and in 1966, aged 26, he won the marginal seat of Griffith in inner Brisbane, and held it against determined challenges from the Australian Labor Party until 1977, when a redistribution nearly erased his majority there. He then shifted to the safer seat of Fadden.

In the big swing to Labor at the 1983 election Cameron was defeated, but he was re-elected shortly after at a by-election for the seat of Moreton, which he held until 1990, when he was again defeated.

In the 2000 Queen's Birthday Honours Cameron was appointed Member of the Order of Australia (AM) for "service to the community, particularly youth, and to the Australian Parliament".

References

1940 births
Living people
Liberal Party of Australia members of the Parliament of Australia
Members of the Australian House of Representatives
Members of the Australian House of Representatives for Fadden
Members of the Australian House of Representatives for Griffith
Members of the Australian House of Representatives for Moreton
Members of the Order of Australia
People educated at Anglican Church Grammar School
20th-century Australian politicians